The Daily American is the name of several newspapers:

 Daily American (Pennsylvania newspaper)
 Daily American (Illinois) (1920–2015)
 Nashville Daily American (c. 1876–1910), Tennessee
 Rome Daily American (1946–1984), Rome, Italy
 Daily American Times (1853–1854), Baltimore, Maryland